Wang Chee-yen (Chinese: 王基瑩, Pinyin: Wáng Jīyíng; born 20 December 1946) is a Taiwanese boxer. He competed at the 1964 Summer Olympics, the 1968 Summer Olympics and the 1972 Summer Olympics. At the 1964 Summer Olympics, he lost to Dominador Calumarde of the Philippines.

References

1946 births
Living people
Taiwanese male boxers
Olympic boxers of Taiwan
Boxers at the 1964 Summer Olympics
Boxers at the 1968 Summer Olympics
Boxers at the 1972 Summer Olympics
Sportspeople from Taipei
Bantamweight boxers
20th-century Taiwanese people